In geometry, a truncated icosahedral prism is a convex uniform polychoron (four-dimensional polytope).

It is one of 18 convex uniform polyhedral prisms created by using uniform prisms to connect pairs of Platonic solids or Archimedean solids in parallel hyperplanes.

Alternative names 
 Truncated-icosahedral dyadic prism (Norman W. Johnson) 
 Tipe (Jonathan Bowers: for truncated-icosahedral prism) 
 Truncated-icosahedral hyperprism

See also
Truncated 600-cell,

External links 
 
 

4-polytopes